Straja Bucharest is a Romanian oina team in the National Senior Championship.

This team finished in 2nd place in season 2002.

External links
 Romanian Federation of Oina

Oina teams